Schlee is a surname and may refer to:

 Aldyr Schlee (1934–2018), Brazilian writer, journalist, translator, illustrator and professor
 Ann Schlee (born 1934), American-born English novelist
 Charles Schlee (1873–1947), American racing cyclist
 Clive Schlee, British businessman
 John Schlee (1939–2000), American golfer
 Nick Schlee (born 1931), English painter
 Rudolf Schlee, recipient of the Knight's Cross of the Iron Cross
 Thomas Daniel Schlee (born 1957), Austrian composer, arts administrator, and organist
 Valentina Schlee (c.1899–1989), Russian émigrée American-based fashion designer and theatrical costume designer